Denis Nikolayevich Soskov (born 15 September 1977) is a former Russian football player.

External links
 

1977 births
Living people
Russian footballers
FC Rostov players
Russian Premier League players
Place of birth missing (living people)
Association football midfielders
FC Chernomorets Novorossiysk players
FC Orenburg players